Peru competed in the 2008 Summer Olympics which was held in Beijing, People's Republic of China from August 8 to August 24, 2008. The country was  represented by at least twelve athletes, who competed in the fields of athletics, badminton, swimming, taekwondo, shooting, wrestling, judo and fencing.

Athletics

Key
 Note – Ranks given for track events are within the athlete's heat only
 Q = Qualified for the next round
 q = Qualified for the next round as a fastest loser or, in field events, by position without achieving the qualifying target
 NR = National record
 N/A = Round not applicable for the event
 Bye = Athlete not required to compete in round

Men
Track & road events

Field events

Women
Track & road events

Badminton

Fencing

Women

Judo

Sailing 

Women

M = Medal race; EL = Eliminated – did not advance into the medal race; CAN = Race cancelled

Shooting 

Men

Swimming 

Men

Women

Taekwondo

Weightlifting

Wrestling 

Key
  - Victory by Fall.
  - Decision by Points - the loser with technical points.
  - Decision by Points - the loser without technical points.

Men's Greco-Roman

See also
 Peru at the 2008 Summer Paralympics
 Peru at the 2007 Pan American Games

References

Nations at the 2008 Summer Olympics
2008
Olympics